Karawari Rural LLG is a local-level government (LLG) of East Sepik Province, Papua New Guinea. Various Ramu, Arafundi (Upper Yuat), and Sepik languages are spoken in the LLG.

Wards
01. Masandanai
02. Kaiwaria
03. Manjamai
04. Konmei
05. Ambonwari
06. Imanmeri (Nanubae language speakers)
07. Kanjimei
08. Kundiman
09. Yimas (Yimas language speakers)
10. Awim (Tapei language speakers)
11. Yamandim (Nanubae language and Tapei language speakers)
12. Imboin (Andai language speakers)
13. Amongabi
14. Chimbut
15. Sikalum
16. Yanitabak
17. Latoma (Sumariup language speakers)
18. Malamata
19. Kotkot
20. Mamri
21. Sangriman
22. Tungimbit
23. Kambraman
24. Kraimbit
25. Kaningara (Kaningra language speakers)
26. Govanmas
27. Anganambai
28. Tarakai
29. Meska
30. Bisorio

References

Local-level governments of East Sepik Province